Anastasios "Tasos" Chatzigiovanis (born 31 May 1997) is a Greek professional footballer who plays as a winger for Turkish Süper Lig club Ankaragücü and the Greece national team.

Career

Panathinaikos
Chatzigiovanis plays mainly as a winger and joined Panathinaikos from the youth ranks of the club in the summer of 2016. Coach Andrea Stramaccioni gave Chatzigiovanis a debut as a late substitute in a 0–3 home defeat to Standard Liège in the UEFA Europa League.

Chatzigiovanis was mostly used as a substitute by Marinos Ouzounidis in the 2017–18 season. On 18 September 2018, in a 3–1 away win game against AEL, Chatzigiovanis scored hs first Super League goal with a last-minute penalty.

On 29 September 2018, Chatzigiovanis scored his second with a header after Ousmane Coulibaly's assist in a 2–1 home win against PAS Giannina. On 2 December, he scored with a penalty kick in stoppage time to secure a 1–1 draw away to Aris. On 5 May 2019, the last matchday of the season, he opened the scoring with a penalty kick in a 4–0 home win against Panetolikos.

In October 2019, Chatzigiovanis signed a new three-year contract with Panathinaikos; it was reported that the player had insisted on a release clause being included. On the same day he scored the only goal of a 1–0 away win against Atromitos. He crossed for Juan José Perea's goal against AEK Athens on 10 November 2019 that helped the team come back from a 2–0 deficit to win 3–2. On 1 December 2019, he scored with a penalty kick, sealing a 1–0 home win against Asteras Tripolis. A week later he scored with another penalty kick, sealing an 1–1 away draw against Volos. On 14 December 2019, he opened the score with another penalty kick in a 2–0 home win game against Lamia. On 25 January 2020, scored with a penalty kick in a 2–0 away win against AEL. On 2 February 2020, Chatzigiovanis scored in a 2–0 home win derby against reigning Super League champions PAOK, as he took advantage of some poor defending by Sverrir Ingi Ingason, and the Greek international forward clipped the ball delicately over Živko Živković, when clean through one-on-one with the visiting keeper. On 1 March 2020, Chatzigiovanis scored with a kick in a 4–1 home win game against Volos.

In July 2021, Panathinaikos accepted a second official approach from the Turkish club Altay S.K. for the transfer of the international midfielder. The new transfer bid was at €1 million, increased by €400,000 compared to their first attempt, but Panathinaikos again responded negatively, clarifying that the transfer is possible only if the proposal reached €1.5 million, his (unofficial) clause.
On 26 September 2021, he scored with a wonderful kick, his first goal of the season, after an assist from Carlitos, in a thriumphic 5–1 home win game against Volos.

MKE Ankaragücü
On May 24th 2022, Turkish Süper Lig football Club MKE Ankaragücü, announced the signing of Chatzigiovanis for two years. There was no transfer fee paid to his previous team Panathinaikos since his contract with them had already expired. 
Chatzigiovanis spent 6 years in the senior team of Panathinaikos after being brought up in their youth academies.

Career statistics

Club

International

Honours
Panathinaikos
Greek Cup: 2021–22

References

External links
Anastasios Chatzigiovanis at pao.gr

1997 births
Living people
Greek footballers
Greece under-21 international footballers
Greece international footballers
Panathinaikos F.C. players
Super League Greece players
Association football midfielders
People from Mytilene
Sportspeople from the North Aegean